Isabelle Charest (born January 3, 1971 in Rimouski, Quebec) is a Canadian athlete and politician. A short track speed skater who competed in the 1994 Winter Olympics, the 1998 Winter Olympics, and the 2002 Winter Olympics, she was elected to the National Assembly of Quebec in the 2018 provincial election as a member of the Coalition Avenir Québec.

In 1994 she was a member of the Canadian relay team which won the silver medal in the 3000 metre relay competition. In the 1000 m event she finished sixth and in the 500 m contest she finished seventh.

Four years later she won the bronze medal with the Canadian team in the 3000 metre relay competition. In the 500 m event as well as in the 1000 m contest she finished seventh.

At the 2002 Games she won her second bronze medal with the Canadian relay team in the 3000 metre relay competition. In the 500 m event she finished fourth.

Charest was the Chef de Mission for Team Canada at the 2018 Winter Olympics.

Controversies  
In February 2019, Charest was criticized by members of the Quebec Liberal Party over comments she made calling hijabs a symbol of oppression. She said that wearing a hijab does not correspond to Quebec values and keeps women from flourishing. "For me, the hijab is not something women should be wearing because it does have, at some point, significance of oppression of women and the fact they have to cover themselves," she said.

Cabinet posts

References

External links
 

1971 births
Living people
Canadian female short track speed skaters
Olympic short track speed skaters of Canada
Olympic silver medalists for Canada
Olympic bronze medalists for Canada
Olympic medalists in short track speed skating
Medalists at the 1994 Winter Olympics
Medalists at the 1998 Winter Olympics
Medalists at the 2002 Winter Olympics
Members of the Executive Council of Quebec
Short track speed skaters at the 1994 Winter Olympics
Short track speed skaters at the 1998 Winter Olympics
Short track speed skaters at the 2002 Winter Olympics
People from Rimouski
Sportspeople from Quebec
Coalition Avenir Québec MNAs
Women government ministers of Canada
Women MNAs in Quebec
Canadian sportsperson-politicians